5-Ethoxy-alpha-methyltryptamine (5-EtO-AMT) is a tryptamine derivative closely related to 5-MeO-AMT. It has an LD50 in mice of 56mg/kg, but its pharmacology has otherwise been little studied.

See also 
 5-Cl-AMT
 5-F-AMT
 5-EtO-DMT
 5-MeO-AET
 O-Acetylbufotenine

References 

Designer drugs
Psychedelic tryptamines
Serotonin receptor agonists